Robert Owen Edwards (born 25 December 1982) is a professional football manager and former player who played as a centre-back and is currently the manager of Championship club Luton Town.

Edwards began his career with Aston Villa, making his senior debut in the Premier League. He then moved to Midlands neighbours Wolverhampton Wanderers in 2004, where he spent four seasons at Championship level. He helped both Blackpool and Norwich to promotions to the Premier League and featured for Barnsley in the Championship before retiring due to injury in 2013.

Edwards managed Wolves' academy and had an interim spell at the first team, before leading AFC Telford United and the England under-16 team. He guided Forest Green Rovers to promotion as League Two champions in the 2021–22 season. From May to September 2022, he managed Watford.

Club career

Aston Villa
Edwards was born in Telford, Shropshire. He started his career as an apprentice at Aston Villa, and worked his way up to his first-team debut on 28 December 2002, in a 1–0 home win over Middlesbrough. In January 2003, after playing in three consecutive matches at right-back he signed a new two-and-a-half-year contract with the club. Edwards went on to make nine appearances in total for the Villans, all during 2002–03. He was sent on loan to First Division club Crystal Palace in November 2003, where he spent one month, playing six games and scoring one goal in a 1–1 draw with Coventry City.

Edwards then joined  fellow First Division club Derby County on loan in January 2004, where he stayed until the end of the season. He played ten games for the club, scoring a goal in a 2–1 home win over Gillingham on 17 January.

In May 2004, Edwards was told by Aston Villa manager David O'Leary that he could leave the club.

Wolverhampton Wanderers
Edwards made the short journey across the West Midlands and joined Championship Wolverhampton Wanderers in July 2004 in a three-year deal for £150,000. After five games in August, he suffered an ankle injury and did not return until February 2005.

Edwards gained more playing time in the 2005–06 campaign and he played the majority of the following season under new manager Mick McCarthy but suffered knee ligament damage in April 2007. that kept him out of the season's end as the team made the play-offs.

On 5 September 2007, in a reserve team match against Walsall, he again suffered knee ligament injury. He scored his only goal for Wolves on 9 February 2008 in a 4–2 home defeat to Stoke City. He was placed on the transfer list in May.

Blackpool
On 6 August 2008, Edwards left Wolves to join Blackpool, signing a two-year contract with an option for a further year for an undisclosed fee. He made his debut for the Seasiders on 9 August 2008 in a 1–0 home defeat to Bristol City. Edwards was captain of the side for the 1–1 draw at Norwich City on 16 August as Keith Southern who had captained the side up to then in the 2008–09 season, was suspended.

On 29 August, Blackpool manager Simon Grayson confirmed that Edwards would be team captain for the season. His first goal for the Seasiders came on 29 December 2008 when he scored Blackpool's second equaliser in a 2–2 draw against his former club Wolverhampton Wanderers at Bloomfield Road. 

Edwards urged all the players to do their utmost to impress  new manager Ian Holloway in June 2009. On 19 July 2010, he agreed a new contract with Blackpool, a one-year deal with an option for a further 12 months. Edwards explained playing in the Premier League was the reason behind him signing a new contract at the club. On 10 November 2010, Edwards made his first Premier League appearance since 2003 in a 3–2 loss at his former club Aston Villa.

On 21 February 2011, Edwards signed for Championship team Norwich City on loan until the end of the season. He made his debut as a second-half substitute for Zak Whitbread in the 1–1 draw against Preston North End on 5 March, and made two more appearances as the club won promotion to the Premier League.

Barnsley
After his release from Blackpool, Edwards was signed for Barnsley on a free transfer, becoming Keith Hill's seventh signing of the summer. Edwards made his debut for the club in a 0–0 draw against Nottingham Forest on 21 February 2012.

Unused by Barnsley, Edwards was loaned to League Two club Fleetwood Town in 2012. The following 31 January, he returned to his home county and joined League One team Shrewsbury Town on loan for a month. Days after the deal was expanded for the rest of the season, he was ruled out with a thigh muscle injury in training.

International career
Edwards represented England at youth level, but not in a UEFA-recognised game, so qualified for Wales as his parents are both Welsh. He made his debut for Wales before he left Aston Villa, on 29 March 2003, in a 4–0 European Championship qualifying victory over Azerbaijan.

Coaching career

Early years

On 11 October 2013, Edwards announced that he had retired from professional football at the age of 30. He became Under-18s coach at Wolves, and his first season in charge (2014–15) was considered very successful by local newspaper Express & Star. He was promoted to help Head Coach Kenny Jackett for the final two months of the season, and then to the role of full-time First Team Coach during the summer of 2015.

On 25 October 2016 Edwards was appointed interim head coach at Wolves following the sacking of Walter Zenga. He took charge of two games – a 1–1 draw at Blackburn Rovers, followed by a 2–3 defeat to Derby – before Paul Lambert took charge. Edwards remained at a club in the role of first team coach until the conclusion of the season when he departed alongside Lambert.

On 28 June 2017, Edwards was named as the new manager of his hometown club AFC Telford United. The Bucks finished in 14th place in the National League North, 10 points outside the play-offs. Edwards left by mutual consent at the end of the season.

Edwards was appointed as the head coach of Wolverhampton Wanderers U23 on 20 July 2018. In his first season in charge, he led them to promotion to Premier League 2 Division 1, the highest level of youth football, for the first time in their history.

In October 2019, Edwards left Wolves to take up a 'prestigious role' with The Football Association working as a coach with the England U20s. On 24 September 2020, he was appointed as head coach for the England under-16 team.

Forest Green Rovers
On 27 May 2021, Edwards was appointed Head Coach of League Two side Forest Green Rovers, joining the role on 4 June in order to be able to finish the season with his England sides. After picking up four wins from his first five matches, Edwards was awarded the EFL League Two Manager of the Month award for August 2021 with his star striker Matty Stevens winning the Player of the Month award. He won the award for a second time for November following three wins from three. 

Edwards then won the manager of the month award for a third time for January 2022 after picking up 14 points from six matches, including a 4–0 win away at second-placed Tranmere Rovers, moving ten points clear at the top of the league. On 23 April, Forest Green drew 0–0 away at Bristol Rovers to secure promotion to League One for the first time in the club's history. The following day, Edwards was named the 2021–22 EFL League Two Manager of the Season at the league's annual awards ceremony. On 11 May, he departed the club following negotiations with Watford.

Watford
On 11 May 2022, Edwards was announced as the new head coach of Watford, taking over from Roy Hodgson at the conclusion of the 2021–22 season. His first game on 1 August was a 1–0 home win over Sheffield United with a goal by João Pedro.

On 26 September 2022, Edwards was sacked as head coach after winning three out of ten league games and with Watford in 10th place.

Luton Town
On 17 November 2022, Edwards was appointed manager of Championship club Luton Town, rivals of Edwards' previous club Watford.

Career statistics

Club

Managerial statistics

Honours

As a player
Blackpool
Football League Championship play-offs: 2010

As a manager
Forest Green Rovers
EFL League Two: 2021–22

Individual
EFL League Two Manager of the Month: August 2021, November 2021, January 2022
EFL League Two Manager of the Season: 2021–22

References

External links

Profile at blackpoolfc.co.uk

1982 births
Living people
English people of Welsh descent 
People from Telford
Footballers from Shropshire
English footballers
Welsh footballers
Association football defenders
Aston Villa F.C. players
Barnsley F.C. players 
Blackpool F.C. players 
Crystal Palace F.C. players
Derby County F.C. players
Fleetwood Town F.C. players 
Norwich City F.C. players 
Shrewsbury Town F.C. players 
Wolverhampton Wanderers F.C. players
English Football League players
Premier League players 
Wales international footballers
Association football coaches 
English football managers
English Football League managers 
National League (English football) managers 
Welsh football managers
AFC Telford United managers
Forest Green Rovers F.C. managers
Watford F.C. managers
Luton Town F.C. managers
Wolverhampton Wanderers F.C. non-playing staff